Rondeau may refer to:

In the arts
Rondeau (forme fixe), a Medieval and Renaissance poetic and musical form
Rondo, also spelled "rondeau", a musical form from the 18th century to the present
Fanfare-Rondeau, by Jean-Joseph Mouret

People
Ann E. Rondeau (born 1951), former US admiral
Bob Rondeau (born 1949/50), former University of Washington sports announcer
Charles Rondeau, 19th-century French playwright
Claudius Rondeau (1695–1739), British Minister Resident to Russia from 1731 to 1739
Gérard Rondeau (1953–2016), French photographer
Jean Rondeau (1946–1985), French automobile racer and constructor
Jim Rondeau (born 1959), politician in Manitoba
José Rondeau (1773–1844), 19th century Argentine general and politician
Noah John Rondeau (1883–1967), Adirondack hermit

Other
Rondeau Provincial Park, in southwestern Ontario

Surnames of French origin

ru:Рондо (значения)